The following is a list of amusement rides manufactured by the now-defunct Arrow Development and Arrow Dynamics. The company changed names and ownership four times between 1945 and 2002, operating as Arrow Development from 1945 to 1981, Arrow-Huss from 1981 to 1984, and as Arrow Dynamics from 1986 to 2001. The remaining assets were purchased by S&S on October 28, 2002. In November 2012, Sansei Yusoki Co. Ltd, acquired controlling interest in S&S and renamed itself S&S Sansei Technologies.

List of roller coasters

As of 2019, the company has built 102 roller coasters around the world.

Thrill rides

Carousels

Narrow gauge/miniature trains

Car rides

Flume and other boat rides

Other rides

Disney property rides

References

Roller coasters manufactured by Arrow Dynamics
Arrow